Ajan may refer to:

People
 Ajan (surname)
 Ajan Fakir, a Sufi saint and poet who came from Baghdad and settled in the Sibsagar area of Assam
 Midhat Ajanović, who often used Ajan as a pen name

Geography
 Ajan Coast
 Ajan, Markazi, a village in Iran
 Ajan, Mazandaran, a village in Iran
 Ajan, Tehran, a village in Iran
 Ajan, local name of Agliano Terme, Asti, Italy

Other uses
 Ajan Faquir Saheb, an Assamese language film produced by Bani Kalita and directed by Asif Iqbal Hussain
 African Jesuit AIDS Network, a network of organizations that fight against HIV/AIDS created by Jesuits on 2002

See also 
 Ajahn, a Thai term of address
 Jan (disambiguation)
 Anjan (disambiguation)